ʿAṯtar is an ancient Semitic deity whose role, name, and even gender varied by cultures of West Asia. In both genders, ʿAṯtar is identified with the planet Venus, the morning and evening star, in some manifestations of Semitic mythology.

Name
The name appears in various Semitic languages as: 
 the feminine form  in Akkadian;
 the masculine form  in Arabic;
 and the masculine form  in Ethiosemitic.

Attestations

Among Amorites

At Ugarit

The Northwest Semitic feminine form of ʿAṯtar, the Great Goddess , is often mentioned in Ugaritic ritual texts, but played a minor role in mythological texts.

Among Aramaeans

The name of this god always appears in the masculine form even in women's names, such as ʿAttar-ramat and ʿAttar-ṭabat, thus attesting that the Aramaean ʿAttar was a distinctly masculine deity.

Due to ʿAttar's role as a provider of rain, and his epithet "of the Heavens" refers to his manifestation as lightning and thunder in the skies.

The position of Hūbis/Huwbis as the consort of ʿAttar-Šamayin is attested by the depiction of a goddess in front of a standing worshipper on an 8th-century Aramaean cylinder seal, with the image of a vulva, the symbol of Hūbis/Huwbis, being present behind the goddess and over a recumbent gazelle - the sacred animal of ʿAttar - over which was also inscribed the name of the god himself.

In South Arabia
Among the ancient South Arabians,  was a masculine deity who had retained the prominence of his role as the deity of the planet Venus as the Morning Star, and was a god presiding over thunderstorms and who provided natural irrigation as rain. ʿAṯtar thus held a very important place within the ancient South Arabian pantheon, in which he replaced the old Semitic high god ʾIl as the supreme deity.

The name of ʿAṯtar was suffixed with a mimation in the South Arabian kingdom of Ḥaḍramawt, thus giving the Ḥaḑramitic form .

Within South Arabian polytheism, and ʿAṯtar held a supreme position within the cosmology of the ancient South Arabians as the god presiding over the whole world, always appeared first in lists, and had various manifestations with their own epithets. The rulers of the ancient South Arabian states would offer ritual banquets in honour of ʿAṯtar, with the banquet being paid for from the tithe offered to the god by the populace.

The hunter god 
The South Arabian ʿAṯtar was a hunter god, and the ancient South Arabians performed ritual hunts in his honour as fertility rites with the goal of making the rain fall. The chosen prey during these hunts were probably gazelles, which were sacred to ʿAṯtar.

This hunter aspect of ʿAṯtar also present in his Northwest Semitic feminine variant, who is called  in one passage of an Ugaritic text.

Kirrūm was thus a form of ʿAṯtar who provided fertility in the form of the rain he dispensed.

The Babylonians identified Kirrūm, under the name , with their own goddess , who was herself the goddess of the planet Venus as well as the Mesopotamian feminine form of ʿAṯtar.

Among Arabs
ʿAṯtar was worshipped as a masculine deity among the ancient Arabs, who during the Iron Age were located principally in the Syrian Desert and North Arabia.

The name "the Marches" itself was the designation assigned by the Mesopotamians to the northern Ḥijāz and the Negev. The name of the deity is followed by the title , corresponding to Ancient North Arabian  and Ethiosemitic , and meaning "the ruler."

ʿAttar-Muṣurūn was thus the main deity of North Arabia, and the tomb in which his name was found inscribed likely belonged to an Arab who had been deported by the Assyrians to their northeastern border regions.

In Qedar

In Palmyra

In Canaan
The masculine form  existed among the Canaanite peoples as an astral deity, which is attested by his mention along with the Moon-God Šaggar in the 9th or 7th century BC Dayr ʿAllā inscription, the subject of which is largely the Sun-goddess Šamāš, thus forming a triad of the Sun, Moon, and Venus similarly to the one attested in South Arabia, and suggesting a South Arabian religious influence in Moab. The hypostases of ʿAṯtar who appear among the various Canaanite peoples might have been an indigenous Transjordanian variation of his or local adaptations of the North Arabian variant of the god.

In Phoenicia

A possible Phoenician variant of  might be attested as a theophoric element  in a personal name from Byblos, .

In the 5th century BC, under the Achaemenid Empire, a shrine dedicated to  existed in the Sharon Plain in Canaan, at a location corresponding to the present-day Israeli town of Elyakhin, where he was worshipped by Phoenicians, Aramaeans, and Arabs.

This form of the god's name was distinctly North Arabian, showing that the worshippers who had left these inscriptions were originally from North Arabia, possibly from Taymāʿ or Dadān.

In Moab

According to the inscription of the Moabite king Mōšaʿ on the victory stele commemorating his triumph in a war against the Israelites, had sacrificed the whole population of the town of Nebo to ʿAštar-Kamōš. This was likely due to the influence of the South Arabian ʿAṯtar-Šariqān, that is of ʿAštar's hypostasis as an avenger deity who was invoked in curses against enemies.

Legacy

In popular culture
ʿAštar appears as the demon Ashtar in Shin Megami Tensei II.

See also
 Venus in culture

References

Sources

 
.

 
 
 
 

 
 

Axumite gods
West Semitic gods
Sky and weather gods
Stellar gods
Fertility gods
Venusian deities
Inanna
War gods
South Arabia
Ugaritic deities